Panaga is a coastal settlement on the north-east coast of the island of Borneo, in the Bruneian district of Belait. The settlement of Panaga comprises a public housing estate under the National Housing Scheme and the housing estate of Brunei Shell Petroleum (BSP), the main oil and gas company in the country. Panaga is also home to the headquarters of the company itself. The postcode for Panaga is KB4533.

Geography
Panaga is located east of the administrative capital of the Belait District, Kuala Belait and west of Seria. It is approximately 110 kilometres south-west of the capital, Bandar Seri Begawan.

Subdivisions
Kampung Panaga can be subdivided into:
Jalan Utara. This is home to a large number of expatriates due to a large concentration of Brunei Shell housing and facilities located in the area. The head offices of Brunei Shell Petroleum is found in this area as well as the well-known clubs Panaga Club and BSRC.
The Canadian Houses area along Jalan Tengah. This area consists mainly of Shell housing facilities built in the style of Canadian log houses. The timber used to construct these houses were imported from Canada.
The area around the Panaga Police Station and Sekolah Rendah Panaga (Panaga Primary School). This area is predominantly Malay and more commonly associated with the term "Kampung Panaga".
The military area immediately to the west of the town area.
North and West of Seria. These are the areas between Panaga proper and the municipality of Seria. It contains a number of British Army and Brunei Shell facilities and housing for both the British Army and Brunei Shell employees.

Kampung Panaga is currently only one 'Kampung', however current plans are to divide Panaga into two parts, namely Kampung Panaga 'A' and Kampung Panaga 'B'.

Public housing 
Some of the residents live in the houses at Perumahan Negara Panaga, a public housing area managed under the Housing Development Department. Planned 2,000 houses was contracted to Bina Puri from Malaysia, thus began construction in 2009 and expected completion by 2011.

Infrastructure 

Panaga is home to the headquarters of BSP which is the primary oil and gas producer in the country.

The Panaga Police Station is also the District's Police Headquarters.

Panaga Health is the sole clinic in the area.

On 7 April 2021, BSP opens a solar energy facility to promote sustainable energy. The 3.3 MW solar farm can provide enough electricity annually to power 600 homes.

Education 

Schools in Panaga include:
Hornbill School Brunei (Private)
Panaga Primary School (Public)
Panaga Religious School (Public)
Panaga School (Private) - consisted of two campuses which are; Teraja Campus and Rampayoh Campus.
ISB Centre for Inclusive Learning (Private)

Recreation 
There are two recreational clubs in the area, the Panaga Club and the Brunei Shell Recreational Club (BSRC), which are primarily used by Brunei Shell Petroleum employees and expatriates. In 2004, the BSRC Football Club was founded in Panaga.

The British Army maintains its own recreational activities within the British Garrison. This area is not open to the public.

References 

Villages in Belait District